Vukosava Đapić (born 21 January 1978) is a Serbian sprinter. She competed in the women's 100 metres at the 2000 Summer Olympics representing Yugoslavia.

References

External links
 

1978 births
Living people
Athletes (track and field) at the 2000 Summer Olympics
Serbian female sprinters
Olympic athletes of Yugoslavia
Place of birth missing (living people)
Olympic female sprinters